Jason Brewster Hursh (born October 2, 1991) is an American former professional baseball pitcher. He previously played in Major League Baseball (MLB) for the Atlanta Braves.

High school and college
Hursh attended Trinity Christian Academy in Addison, Texas. After graduating, the Pittsburgh Pirates selected Hursh in the sixth round of the 2010 Major League Baseball (MLB) Draft. Hursh decided not to sign, instead enrolling at Oklahoma State University–Stillwater, to play college baseball for the Oklahoma State Cowboys baseball team. He underwent Tommy John surgery in his sophomore year. As a junior, Hursh pitched to a 6–5 win–loss record with a 2.79 earned run average (ERA) in 16 games started. He was named to the All-Big 12 Conference second team.

Professional career
The Atlanta Braves selected Hursh with the 31st overall selection in the 2013 MLB Draft. Hursh signed with the Braves, receiving a $1.7 million signing bonus, and was assigned to the Rome Braves of the Class A South Atlantic League. With Rome, Hursh had a 0.67 ERA in 27 innings. Hursh began the 2014 season with the Mississippi Braves of the Class AA Southern League. Hursh spent the entire season there, making 26 starts and one relief appearance, with a 3.58 ERA. Hursh spent most of the 2015 season with Mississippi, appearing in 25 games. He was converted to a reliever in July and promoted to the Gwinnett Braves in August. He made 15 starts and ten relief appearances with a 5.14 ERA at the Double–A level. On August 12, 2016, Hursh was called up by the Braves. Six days later, he was optioned to Gwinnett.

Hursh began the 2017 season with Gwinnett and was called up on April 12. He was optioned back to Gwinnett two days later, while Luke Jackson was called up. Hursh would remain at AAA until May 11, 2017, when he was demoted to AA. After 10 relief appearances at Mississippi during which he had a 1.23 ERA, the Braves recalled Hursh on June 6, 2017, replacing the injured Bartolo Colón on the roster. He was optioned to Gwinnett on June 10, 2017 when Sean Newcomb was called up. However, he was recalled the following day to replace Eric O'Flaherty. He was optioned back to Gwinnett when Colón was activated from the disabled list on June 28, 2017.  Hursh was recalled again on July 14, replacing Jason Motte. He was optioned back to Gwinnett three days later when the Braves made a series of roster moves. He was once again recalled on July 27, replacing Aaron Blair who had been optioned. He was optioned back to Gwinnett on August 5, while Max Fried was called up. He was called up on August 30, but would be optioned back the next day. He would not be included in expanded rosters in September.
Hursh began 2018 in major league spring training, but was sent to minor league camp on March 4, 2018. He began the season at Mississippi, but returned to Gwinnett after three scoreless outings. On November 4, 2019, Hursh elected free agency.

References

External links

1991 births
Living people
People from Carrollton, Texas
Baseball players from Texas
Major League Baseball pitchers
Atlanta Braves players
Oklahoma State Cowboys baseball players
Rome Braves players
Mississippi Braves players
Gwinnett Braves players
Gwinnett Stripers players